Scarlet is a creator-owned comic book series written by Brian Michael Bendis and illustrated by Alex Maleev. It was initially published by Marvel Comics under the company's Icon imprint and later published by DC Comics under the company's Jinxworld imprint.

The series is about a young woman named Scarlet Rue from Portland who rebels against a corrupt society and ends up starting a new American revolution in the process. The series often breaks the fourth wall in that the protagonist talks to the reader of the comic.

Bendis and Maleev previously collaborated on Daredevil, Spider-Woman, and Halo: Uprising.  Scarlet was published on an irregular schedule.

Collected editions

Television series
A television series is being developed for Cinemax.

Notes

References

Comics by Brian Michael Bendis